Jean-Baptiste Buterne (c. 1650 – 28 March 1727) was a French classical organist.

Biography 
Jean-Baptiste Buterne was born in Toulouse. His father was an organist.

Jean-Baptiste was appointed an organist at Saint-Étienne-du-Mont in Paris in 1674. He left this position in 1726 and was replaced by Claude-Nicolas Ingrain.

He was appointed organist of the Chapelle royale in 1678, quarter of April, at the same time as Lebègue, Thomelin and Nivers, a position he held until 1702. He was succeeded by Garnier, the organist from Saint-Louis-des-Invalides.

In 1673, he succeeded Henri Du Mont at the organ of Saint-Paul; he remained there until 1726. Daquin succeeded him.

His son, Charles Buterne, a squire, harpsichord master of the Duchess of Burgundy and organist, left behind some compositions and a method of learning music.

Works 
 Petites Règles pour l’accompagnement, manuscript kept at the Sainte-Geneviève Library.

Sources 
 Dictionnaire de la musique : les hommes et leurs œuvres.
 Georges Servières. Document inédits sur les Organistes français des XVIIe et XVIIIe siècles, Paris, Schola Cantorum, c. 1925.

References

External links 
 Buterne Jean-Baptiste on Musicology.org
 Buterne, Jean-Baptiste on IMSLP
 Jean-Babtiste Buterne: Sonate in F on YouTube

Musicians from Toulouse
17th-century French musicians
French classical organists
French male organists
1650 births
1727 deaths
17th-century male musicians
Male classical organists